2015–16 Vijay Hazare Trophy is the 14th season of the Vijay Hazare Trophy, a List A cricket tournament in India. It is contested by 27 domestic cricket teams of India divided into 4 Groups. The winner will advance to play 2015–16 Deodhar Trophy.
The top two teams advanced to the quarter finals.

Fixtures

Round one
Ashoke Dinda (3/40)-led attack held Goa to 235 for nine, Manoj Tiwary took Bengal to victory with an unbeaten 62-run knock off as many balls. Chasing the target, Shreevats Goswami (70) set-up the innings with a 116-run opening stand with S Mondal. The Bengal captain then took his team to the target with 52 balls to spare.

Leading from the front, captain Eklavya Dwivedi led UP to the 244-run target with an unbeaten 104. The batsman's maiden List A century came off 127 balls with 15 boundaries. He was ably supported by Rinku Singh, who remained not out on 62. Earlier while Praveen Kumar (2/37) and Piyush Chawla (3/49) claimed wickets at regular intervals, Rishi Dhawan lifted HP to 243 with an unbeaten 67-run knock. Left on 126 for six the all-rounder had held the innings together to take the team to a modest score.

Round two
Ravindra Jadeja starred in the Saurashtra's victory with the bat and the ball. While Sheldon Jackson scored 111, Jadeja made 134 off 117 before falling to Ishwar Pandey off the last ball. After being left on 53 for three, Jackson and Jadeja built a 135-run partnership to revive the innings. The all-rounder then built a 152-run stand for the fifth wicket with Chirag Jani to set MP a stiff target. 

Jalaj Saxena then led MP's fight with a run-a-ball 133 while Rajat Patidar and Naman Ojha scored half-centuries to keep the team in the game. While Shaurya Sanandia claimed three, Jaydev Unadkat claimed two and Jadeja wrapped-up MP's innings for 334 to finish with two scalps.

The 157-run stand for the second wicket between Prashant Chopra (91) and Robin Bist (84) laid a platform for a formidable score for HP after being asked to bat. Paras Dogra (78) and Rishi Dhawan (31) then added 101 for the fourth wicket to keep the innings on course. The rest of the lineup did poorly but the two solid partnerships helped the team to a 308-run total. 

Pankaj Jaswal then claimed three while captain Bipul Sharma picked two wickets to bowl Bengal out for 219 and post their first win of the tournament.

Ravindra Jadeja starred in the Saurashtra's victory with the bat and the ball. While Sheldon Jackson scored 111, Jadeja made 134 off 117 before falling to Ishwar Pandey off the last ball. After being left on 53 for three, Jackson and Jadeja built a 135-run partnership to revive the innings. The all-rounder then built a 152-run stand for the fifth wicket with Chirag Jani to set MP a stiff target. 

Jalaj Saxena then led MP's fight with a run-a-ball 133 while Rajat Patidar and Naman Ojha scored half-centuries to keep the team in the game. While Shaurya Sanandia claimed three, Jaydev Unadkat claimed two and Jadeja wrapped-up MP's innings for 334 to finish with two scalps.

Round three

Round four

Round five

Round six

Round seven

References

Domestic cricket competitions in 2015–16